Ambrose Field is a British composer.

Field’s music is characterised by lush, harmonic sound worlds and evocative vocal textures.   It connects both ancient and contemporary approaches to composition, often drawing inspiration from visual cultures.  The influence of medieval forms and process is audible in his current music, yet this is combined with a sound world informed by spectralism, room acoustics, and the possibilities offered by live electronics.

Works
 Aqueduct Zero
 Geosphere
 Grey Sky Traffic
 Till
 Expanse Hotel (first performed at the ICMC in China, 1999)
 One Hell of a place to lose a cow
 UK weather
 Storm! (on Sargasso Records)
 Being Dufay, 2009 (choral works by medieval composer Guillaume Dufay set to electronic music).

Prizes
 Prix Ars Electronica honourable mentions; 1997,1998 and 2006
 Electroacoustic tape music without instrument, 2003 Bourges Competition.
 Laureate, 30e Concours  International de Musique et d'Art Sonore Electroacoustique (2004)

Samples online
Storm! (2 tracks)
Being Dufay (1 track)

References

British composers
English academics
Musicians from York
Living people
Year of birth missing (living people)